Manase Tonga (born February 28, 1984) is a former American football fullback. He was signed by the Oakland Raiders as an undrafted free agent in 2010, cut at the conclusion of the preseason, and subsequently signed to the practice squad. He played college football at Brigham Young University.

Early years
Tonga attended Aragon High School in San Mateo, California, where he was an All-County and All-League selection he also had his jersey retired.  He also holds several rushing records there, including yards in a season and yards in a game.

College career
After graduating from high school and serving a LDS church mission to Honduras, Tonga attended Brigham Young University and served as a lead blocker for all-time rusher Harvey Unga. Tonga scored 22 touchdowns both rushing and receiving.

Professional career
Tonga was signed by the Oakland Raiders in April 2010 after going undrafted in the 2010 NFL Draft. He was cut by the Oakland Raiders in September 2010 when teams were required to get rosters down to 53 players, but then was re-signed to the practice squad. In 2011, Tonga was released during final cuts by the Raiders, but later was re-signed to the practice squad the next day. Tonga was signed to the active roster on October 8, 2011. Tonga was released from the Raiders on August 29, 2012.

BYU Cougars
Tonga is currently working as a graduate assistant coach at BYU under head coach Kalani Sitake.

References
Oakland Raiders bio
BYU Cougars bio

1984 births
Living people
American football fullbacks
BYU Cougars football players
Oakland Raiders players
People from San Mateo, California
Latter Day Saints from California
American Mormon missionaries in Honduras
Players of American football from California
Sportspeople from the San Francisco Bay Area
American people of Tongan descent
21st-century Mormon missionaries